Erkki Ruuhinen (born September 3, 1943, in Toivakka, Finland) is the Finnish Graphic Designer and Artist Professor of Design 1996–2001.
Erkki Ruuhinen is a Finnish designer specializing in business emblems, logos and designing corporate image systems, i.e. design management.

Career 

Erkki Ruuhinen is probably the Finnish graphic designer with the most awards from professional competitions, over 150 of them, half  from international competitions.
	
He was the first graphic designer to be nominated Graphic Artist of the Year in 1985. One year later, he was invited to join the world's top society of typographers, The Type Directors Club of New York, as its only Finnish graphic artist member to date. 		He received the platinum top award in the Top of the Year competition awards in 1986,  the  competition's highest recognition for a designer whose creative input has influenced the development of the entire field in Finland. He is also the only graphic artist to have received the State Prize for Industrial Design twice, in 1969 and 1989.
	
His design work has been presented in many books and professional journals distributed worldwide. For example, the world's most prestigious graphic design periodical, Graphis Magazine, the Japanese Idea Magazine  and German Novum Gebrauchsgraphik  have published surveys of his work. 
	
He has also participated extensively in exhibitions in Finland and in Europe, the US, Japan, Australia and South America. His posters are included in the collections of poster museums in Lahti, Amsterdam, Paris, Tokyo and Warsaw.
	
At the beginning of his career, he worked with two leading Finnish advertising agencies. In 1983, he founded his own office specializing in graphic design, visual corporate image designing and consultation, Erkki Ruuhinen Design,  based in Helsinki. 
	
His office has designed annual reports, posters and various typographic products as well as business emblems, logos and corporate visual image systems for large and small companies in Finland. 
	
He has also written and lectured on graphic design and been involved in founding the three most important events in the field in Finland. The Top of the Year competition, which has developed into the top-ranking annual review of Finnish graphic design and advertising, was his idea. He was also involved in setting up The Best Campaigns of the Year competition, whose aim is to improve strategic thinking in Finnish design, marketing and advertising. He also presented the idea of nominating a Graphic Artist of the Year, the purpose of the nomination being to gain media attention for graphic design in Finland once a year.

In recognition of his work for Finnish graphic design,  Ruuhinen was appointed an Artist Professor in crafts and design in 1996. The National Council for Crafts and Design had never before nominated a graphic designer as Artist Professor.

Design projects 
Visual redesign of Kesko Group and its four retail companies, one of the biggest visual design projects for companies in Finland. In 1993-1994 Erkki Ruuhinen designed the visual style of Kesko Group: K-Nearshop, K-Market, K-Supermarket and Citymarket.

In addition his small company has designed logos and visual style for the following companies, products and communities: Ilmarinen Pension Insurance Company, Labsystems Oy, Marja Kurki Design, Garantia Insurance Company, Orion Diagnostica, The City of Helsinki, Helsinki Waterworks, Heureka the Finnish Science Center, Marketing Institute, The Association of Finnish Advertisers, Tampere Hall, Expomark, Pellervo Confederation of Finnish Cooperatives, Turva Insurance Company, WSOY Company Books, Valtra Valmet, Vantaa Energy, Yellow Transport, Crafts Association Taito Group and Taito-Shop retail stores, Find exhibitions of Finnish design held in nine European capitals of culture in 2000, Jyväskylä Educational Consortium and Jyväskylä Institute of Adult Education.

Film posters 
In Finland Ruuhinen is known as a designer of posters for films and other cultural events. He has designed logos, posters and presentation material, to be used both in Finland and abroad, for almost all films directed, produced or financed by Jörn Donner.

Internationally, the most notable film posters by Erkki Ruuhinen are two posters designed for the Academy Award winning film Fanny and Alexander by Ingmar Bergman in 1982. Numerous versions of the posters and logo have been designed around the world. Jörn Donner has a collection of them. Some of these posters were exhibited in Amos Andersson art gallery in 1993 during the 25th anniversary exhibition of Jörn Donner Productions.

The following museums have Ruuhinen's posters in their collection: Lahden julistetaiteen museo, Lahti, Finland, Stedelijk Museum, Amsterdam, International Poster Museum, Warsaw, Muss d’Affiche, Paris, and the Poster Museum of Musashino Art University, Tokyo.

Calligraphy 
Ruuhinen started his career in type design working for YLE, the Finnish Broadcasting Company. He designed logos, titles and typography for the YLE TV1 studio even before his studies in Advertising Artist School in 1964. Simultaneously, he studied rhetoric and wrote an essay about the development of Western writing. In 1964 he started teaching calligraphy in the Finnish Folk High School in Helsinki.

As a youngster, Ruuhinen was interested in calligraphy and type design. While working and studying he developed his skills with book covers, ex libris, logos and monograms. In 1966 he took part in Visual Graphics Corporation's international competition for type design in the USA. Later he took part in several exhibitions of typography and calligraphy in the USA. Several museums have Ruuhinen's calligraphy in their collections, and his work has been published in numerous international publications.

Awards / Prizes 
Finnish State Prize for Applied Arts, 1969, 1989
Best Poster of the Year Award, Helsinki, 1968, 1969, 1970, 1971, 1972, 1973, 1976, 1978, 1979, 1980, 1981, 1982, 1983, 1984, 1985
Silver Medal, Poster Biennale, Brno, 1970, 1974
Silver Medal, Poster Biennale, Warsaw, 1972
Gold Medal, Rizzoli Advertising Competition, Milan, 1972
Film Expo Awards, Ottawa, 1972
Gold, silver and bronze medals 1975 and silver medal 1977 and 1979, Poster Biennial, Lahti
Communication Arts Awards, Palo Alto, 1978
New Clio Awards, New York, 1979, 1980, 1982, 1983
Type Directors Club Awards, New York, 1982, 1983, 1984, 1985
Graphic Designers of the Year in Finland, 1985
Special Platinum Award for Top Designer of the Year (Advertising and Graphic Design Competition), Helsinki, 1986, and about 40 awards in the same competition 1980-90
The Bank Card of the Year in Europe, Frankfurt, 1992.
 Artist Professor, 1996–2001

Sources 
 Taiteen huipulta, The apex of the arts, Publisher: The Arts Council of Finland, Helsinki, 1998, Editor: Maria Mäkelä, pages 66–67 in Finnish, pages 68–69 in English.
 Erkki Ruuhinen Design, Helsinki 1985, Publisher: Erkki Ruuhinen Oy, .
 Who's Who in Graphic Art, edited by Walter Amstutz, Dübendorf 1982 
 Articles in magazines:
 Graphis Magazine (Zürich): Erkki Ruuhinen Design, text by Richard Hayhurst, no. 255, May/June 1988, pages: 40–53.
 Articles in Idea Magazine (Tokyo): Erkki Ruuhinen, text by Richard Hayhurst, no. 209, 1988, pages: 34–39.
 Articles in Novum Gebrauchsgraphik (Munich): The Designer Erkki Ruuhinen, by Professor Dieter Urban, no. 12, 1986, pages 18–25.
 Who's Who in Finland, 2001, Otava, .

References

External links 
 Homepage: Designer.fi
 Blog: Erkkiruuhinen.fi
 International Exhibition of Calligraphy: Erkki Ruuhinen Biography
 Wikipedia in Finnish

1943 births
Living people
People from Toivakka
Finnish designers